Dovzhky is an inhabited locality in Ukraine and it may refer to:

 Dovzhky, Slavuta Raion, a village in Slavuta Raion, Khmelnytskyi Oblast
 Dovzhky, Skole Raion, a village in Skole Raion, Lviv Oblast